"Mudshovel" (originally "Mudshuvel") is a song by the American rock band Staind. It was released in 1996 as the first single from Tormented and then released as the third single from their 1999 studio album Dysfunction. It reached number 14 on the US Modern Rock Charts and number 10 on the Mainstream Rock charts. It originally appeared in a heavier form as 'Mudshuvel' on their debut album Tormented.

Composition
Musically, both versions of "Mudshovel" rely on a distinctive three-note bass line that shifts into a rumbling low accompanied by a guitar playing rapidly ascending and descending natural harmonics on the A string which pulsate with the rhythm. It opens the song and is preceded by tense vocals before escalating during the chorus. The re-recorded version is more polished than the one that appeared on Tormented, taking out the screams, double kick, and chugging guitar to fit the modern rock radio format where it succeeded.

Music video
A music video was filmed for the single. It mostly consists of the band playing in an enclosed arena on an elevated glass stage above a mosh pit and frontman Aaron Lewis clutching a loose gate. Interspersed with this is a storyline involving a man being cheated on by his wife/girlfriend, only for her to be cheated on as well in the ending.

Charts

References

External links
 Lyrics of this song at Genius

1999 singles
1996 songs
Staind songs
Elektra Records singles
Song recordings produced by Terry Date
Songs written by Aaron Lewis
Songs written by Mike Mushok